Perumannoor is a village situated in the Arackal Village  Edamulackal Panchayath Punalur Taluk in the district of Kollam in India. This village is situated about 1.5 kms from Main Central Road and 65 km north of the capital city of Thiruvananthapuram in the state of Kerala. It is a calm and quiet place with good inter personal relation ships. It is famous for its festivals, Churches and temples, such as Perumannoor Devi temple, Shri Krishna temple and Pullamcode Marthoma Church. The Perumannoor Government LPS, Public Library & Sub PHC are the main land marks. The place is basically an agricultural area with lot of rubber plantations and vegetable cultivation. But recently all the agricultural produces are being damaged my monkeys, wild boars and porcupines.  The famous Malamel Shiva temple (Irumbazhikunnu temple) and Arackal devi temple are also near this village.

References

Villages in Kollam district